Roger White Stoller (born January 21, 1954) is an American sculptor who specializes in large works integrating stainless steel, bronze and granite.  He currently works out of studios in Portola Valley and San Jose, California.

Background 

Stoller was born and raised in Santa Monica, California.  His early influences include architect and global thinker R. Buckminster Fuller and sculptor Isamu Noguchi.  Stoller received his Bachelor of Science in product design from the Art Center College of Design in 1981.

Over the next fifteen years, Stoller founded the design firm Stoller Design and co-founded Praxis Design Associates, both specializing in product development for corporate clients.  While working in the field he taught in the industrial design program at San Jose State University.

In 1996, Stoller left Praxis and established the sculpture firm Stoller Studio, committing himself to sculpture entirely.  He currently sculpts full-time out of studios in Portola Valley and San Jose, California.

Artistic work

Stoller Studio's ongoing production is in public art, abstract fine art works and applied art commissions. Stoller specializes in large-scale, signature works including materials such as stainless steel, bronze, granite, water, and light.  His sculpture often abstractly reflects forms found in nature.  "By incorporating and interpreting the underlying geometry nature is using, I walk in the tension between precise control and the sheer joy of spontaneous expression. It is the awesome power of nature and the exploration into the essence of life that fuel my passion; this is why I sculpt."  -Roger Stoller

Notable installations 
 Heritage Tree, Texas A&M University, College Station, TX, 2019
 Winged Helix, Dixie State University, St, George, UT, 2018
 Milan's Helix, Bellarmine College Prep, San Jose, CA 2018
 VIVO, City of Tamarac, FL, 2018
 Kindred Spirits, Pima Animal Control Center, Tucson, AZ, 2018
 L'Mara, El Paso Zoo, El Paso, TX, 2016
 Coastal Helix, City of Carlsbad, CA, 2014
 Sunhelix, Texas Tech University System, 2013 
 Vibrant River, Ford Center, Evansville, IN, 2013 
 Cloud Forest, Mitchell Park Library, Palo Alto, CA, 2013
 Luminous Oak, South Bowie Library, Largo, MD, 2012
 Oceano, Allen Public Library, Allen, TX, 2009 
 Gateway Icon, City of Stockton, CA, 2009
 Tetra Con Brio, Strathmore Hall Arts Center, Bethesda, MD, 2006

Gallery

References

Further reading
Stoller Studio, Inc. - View All Press
Indiana Economic Digest
"Sculpture installed in Carlsbad roundabout". The Coast News.
InMenlo

1954 births
Living people
Artists from Los Angeles
Art Center College of Design alumni
People from Portola Valley, California
Sculptors from California